Markus Werba (born 14 November 1973) is an Austrian baritone opera singer.

Biography
Born in Carinthia, Austria, Werba began his vocal training aged 16. He studied at the Conservatory of Klagenfurt and University of Music and Performing Arts, Vienna with  Ralf Doering, Robert Holl and Walter Berry. He has won numerous competitions for his singing in Austria, Italy, Japan, Slovakia and the UK. He was chosen as Guglielmo in 1997 (Così fan tutte) for the inauguration of the Nuovo Piccolo Teatro in Milan by Giorgio Strehler.

After his debut in Milan he sang in all major opera houses.

Operatic repertoire

Bellini
Sir Riccardo Forth (I puritani)

Braunfels
Wiedehopf (Die Vögel)

Britten
Billy Budd (Billy Budd)
Demetrius (A Midsummer Night's Dream)

Cavalli
Mercurio (La Calisto)

Debussy
Pelléas (Pelléas et Mélisande)

Donizetti
Don Alfonso (La favorita)
Malatesta (Don Pasquale)
Belcore (L'elisir d'amore)
Lord Enrico Ashton (Lucia di Lammermoor)

Korngold
Frank-Fritz (Die tote Stadt )

Lehàr
Danilo (Die lustige Witwe)

Marschner
Hans Heiling (Hans Heiling)

Massenet
Athanaël (Thaïs)

Mozart
Papageno (The Magic Flute)
Guglielmo / Don Alfonso (Così fan tutte)
Don Giovanni (Don Giovanni)
Figaro / Il Conte (Le nozze di Figaro)
Nardo (La finta giardiniera)

Rossini
Figaro (Il barbiere di Siviglia)
Dandini (La Cenerentola)

Thomas
Hamlet (Hamlet)
 
Tchaikovsky
Eugene Onegin (Eugene Onegin)

Paisiello
Giorgino (Il matrimonio inaspettato)

Puccini
Marcello (La bohème)

Schubert
Froila (Alfonso und Estrella)

Schumann
Faust, Pater Seraphicus, Doctor Marianus (Szenen aus Goethes Faust)

J.Strauss    
Eisenstein, Falke (Die Fledermaus)

R.Strauss  
Harlequin (Ariadne auf Naxos)
Olivier (Capriccio)

Verdi 
Marquis de Posa (Don Carlo)
Ford (Falstaff)

Wagner
Beckmesser (Die Meistersinger) 
Wolfram (Tannhäuser)

Concert and Lieder repertoire

CONCERT

Brahms 
Requiem

Bach
Solobasskantaten "ich habe genug", Kreuzstabkantate
Johannespassion
Matthäuspassion

Fauré
Requiem

Haydn
Schöpfung

Mendelssohn
Elias
Paulus

Mozart
Mass in C minor
Krönungsmesse

Mahler
Des Knaben Wunderhorn
Lieder eines fahrenden Gesellen

Orff
Carmina Burana

Schubert
Messe in C-Dur
Messe in G-Dur

LIEDER

Brahms

Schubert

Schumann

Wolf

Discography 
DVDs
 Heinrich Marschner, Hans Heiling (M.Werba, A.C.Antonacci, H.Lippert, G.Fontana; regia P.L.Pizzi) aprile 2004 Cagliari, Teatro Lirico. Dynamic 33467/1-2
 Wolfgang Amadeus Mozart, La finta giardiniera (Gens,Kučerová,Reinprecht,Donose,Ainsley, Graham-Hall, Werba, Ivor Bolton) 2006 Mozarteum Orchestra Salzburg
 Franz Schubert, Alfonso und Estrella (Mei, Trost, Werba) Orchestra and Chorus of Teatro Lirico di Cagliari
 Wolfgang Amadeus Mozart, Die Zauberflote. Bernard Richter, Julia Kleiter, Mandy Fredrich, Georg Zeppenfeld, Markus Werba, Elisabeth Schwarz, Concentus Musicus Wien / Nikolaus Harnoncourt. Sony 2 DVD
 Die Meistersinger von Nürnberg  Actors: Michael Volle, Georg Zeppenfeld, Markus Werba, Monika Bohinec, Roberto Saccà; conductor: Daniele Gatti, Vienna Philharmonic

References

External links
 Markus Werba Hilbert Artists Management (in German)
 Markus Werba Operabase
 blog of Markus Werba
 YouTube

1973 births
Living people
Austrian operatic baritones
People from Carinthia (state)
University of Music and Performing Arts Vienna alumni
21st-century Austrian  male opera singers